The United States House of Representatives elections in Arkansas occurred on November 5, 2002 to elect the members of the State of Arkansas's delegation to the United States House of Representatives. Arkansas had four seats in the House, apportioned according to the 2000 United States Census.

These elections were held concurrently with the United States Senate elections of 2002 (including one in Arkansas), the United States House elections in other states, and various state and local elections.

Overview

Results

References

2002 Arkansas elections
Arkansas
2002